The Whopperettes is a series of advertisements created by Crispin, Porter + Bogusky for Burger King, featuring Brooke Burke.

Background
The commercials premiered during Super Bowl XL and featured the King orchestrating a Broadway-style show, reminiscent of The Rockettes' Shows, featuring women dressed as burger condiments and toppings. The King is featured "directing" the show. The commercial was shot in a warehouse in Rio de Janeiro, Brazil. It took a total of five days to complete the shooting of it. Brooke Burke was cast as the role of the Top Bun in this commercial.

Virtual interaction
After the commercials were over, the audience had the ability to go onto The Whopperettes website and create their own show. The website allows the user to enter their name and what condiments they prefer on their Whopper, and once they finish that, they can watch their show that they customized to their liking.

Staff
The staff who played roles in producing this commercial include the following:
Creative Director : Rob Reilly
Director : Bryan Buckley
Production Company : Hungry Man Productions, NYC
Costume Designer : Angus Strathie
Choreographer : Michael Rooney

See also
 Burger King advertising
 Crispin, Porter + Bogusky

References

External links
 Crispin, Porter + Bogusky’s homepage

Burger King characters
Burger King advertising
Mascots introduced in 2006
Female characters in advertising